Giulio Falcone (born 31 May 1974) is an Italian former footballer who played as a defender.

Club career 
Falcone played for Italian sides Torino, Fiorentina, Bologna, Sampdoria, and Parma throughout his career. He signed for Sampdoria from Bologna on free transfer in 2003.

International career 
Falcone made his Italy national team debut and only appearance for Italy, along with Sampdoria teammates Christian Terlizzi, Gennaro Delvecchio, and Angelo Palombo, in a 2–0 loss to Croatia in Livorno, on 16 August 2006.

Honours 
Torino
Coppa Italia (1) : 1992–93

Fiorentina
Supercoppa Italiana (1) : 1996

References

External links 
  Official Website

1974 births
Living people
Sportspeople from the Province of Teramo
Italian footballers
Italy international footballers
Italy under-21 international footballers
Torino F.C. players
ACF Fiorentina players
Bologna F.C. 1909 players
U.C. Sampdoria players
Parma Calcio 1913 players
Serie A players
Association football defenders
Footballers from Abruzzo